The Albatros C.I, (post-war company designations L.6 & L.7), was the first of the successful C-series of two-seat general-purpose biplanes built by Albatros Flugzeugwerke during World War I. Based on the unarmed Albatros B.II, the C.I reversed the pilot and observer seating so that the observer occupied the rear cockpit which was fitted with a ring-mounted 7.92 mm (0.312 in) Parabellum MG14 machine gun.

Design and development
In late 1914, the German Luftstreitkräfte, the air service of the Imperial German Army, developed a requirement for two-seat aircraft, the C-type, powered by engines of at least  and armed with at least one machine gun. The Albatros Flugzeugwerke's design to meet this requirement, the Albatros C.I, was designed by Robert Thelen as a development of Albatros' unarmed B.II biplane. It differed from the B.II by having a more powerful engine, while the pilot was moved to the front cockpit, with the observer in the rear cockpit being provided with a flexibly mounted machine gun, usually a Parabellum MG 14, but sometimes the less satisfactory Bergmann MG 15. It was powered by a  Benz Bz.III or a  Mercedes D.III engine, both water-cooled six-cylinder inline engines depending on availability. Aircraft used by the Imperial German Navy used the  Rapp Rp III engine as they were denied access to the preferred Benz or Mercedes engines. Most aircraft were fitted with radiators  attached to the side of the fuselage, but later aircraft replaced these with a radiator fitted to the centre-section leading edge of the upper wing. 

About 485 C.Is were ordered from Albatros in 1915, with a further 88 C.Is ordered from Luft-Fahrzeug-Gesellschaft (which used the trade name Roland for its aircraft), while 56 C.Is were ordered from Albatros' Austro-Hungarian subsidiary Ostdeutsche Albatros Werke (OAW) for the Austro-Hungarian Aviation Troops.  

In 1917, in response to a growing demands for training its aircrew, the Luftstreitkräfte placed a series of very large orders for trainer aircraft, including the C.I. The Bayerische Flugzeug-Werke (BFW) built the C.Ia, designed to be powered by the  Argus As III, while the C.Ib, powered by a Mercedes D.III, was built by Mercur Flugzeugbau. In August 1918, Albatros and Mercur received orders for a new trainer version, the C.If, with pneumatic springs replacing the rubber shock cords used in the aircraft's undercarriage owing to shortages of raw materials, although it unclear how many, if any, C.Ifs were completed. Improvements to the C.I resulted in the Albatros C.III which became the most prolific of the Albatros C-types.

Operational history
The Albatros C.I began to reach units at the front at the end of April 1915, serving in reconnaissance, artillery spotting, bombing and photography roles. The type proved successful, with its good performance, easy handling and robust construction making it popular with its crews. Its effective armament also resulted in the C.I used as a fighter aircraft - Oswald Boelcke claimed his first victory while flying a C.I with Lt. von Wühlisch as the gunner. Germany's most famous World War I aviator, Manfred von Richthofen, also began his career as an observer in the C.I on the Eastern Front. Through the rest of 1915, the C.I was one of the most numerous C-type aircraft of the front, with 228 aircraft in service at the end of the year, 42% of the total strength of C-type aircraft. The type was phased out over the Western Front during 1916, replaced by the Albatros C.III, but continued in service over the Russian Front well into 1917.

The C.I's viceless handling made it a successful trainer, being used to both to train the crews of observation aircraft and, with dual controls, as a pilot trainer, and it remained in use until the end of the war.

Variants
C.I
Two-seat reconnaissance aircraft. First production version.
C.Ia
Improved version powered by more powerful Argus As III engine, built by BFW and by LFG
C.Ib
Dual-control training version built by Mercur Flugzeugbau.
C.If

C.Ifd

C.I-V
Experimental aircraft. One built.

Operators

Bulgarian Air Force

Luftstreitkräfte

Lithuanian Air Force operated this type postwar.

Polish Air Force operated 49 aircraft postwar.

Swedish Air Force (Postwar)

Ottoman Air Force

Specifications (C.I)

See also

References

Notes

Bibliography

 Angelucci, Enzo. The Rand McNally Encyclopedia of Military Aircraft, 1914-1980. San Diego, California:  The Military Press, 1983. .

Further reading

External links

 Profile of the plane on page of the Polish Aviation Museum
 Air-to-air photo dated 1916 at Airliners.net

Biplanes
Single-engined tractor aircraft
1910s German military reconnaissance aircraft
Military aircraft of World War I
C.01
Aircraft first flown in 1915